Worasit Vechaphut (born 13 November 1976) is a Thai sprinter. He competed in the men's 4 × 100 metres relay at the 1996 Summer Olympics.

References

1976 births
Living people
Athletes (track and field) at the 1996 Summer Olympics
Worasit Vechaphut
Worasit Vechaphut
Place of birth missing (living people)
Asian Games medalists in athletics (track and field)
Athletes (track and field) at the 1998 Asian Games
Worasit Vechaphut
Medalists at the 1998 Asian Games
Worasit Vechaphut
Worasit Vechaphut
Southeast Asian Games medalists in athletics
Worasit Vechaphut